The 2013 Campeonato Goiano de Futebol was the 70th season of Goiás' top professional football league. The competition began on January 20 and ended on May 19. Goiás were the champion by the 24th time. Rio Verde and Itumbiara were relegated.

Format
The tournament consists of a double round-robin format, in which all ten teams play each other twice. The four better-placed teams will face themselves in playoffs matches. The bottom two teams on overall classification will be relegated.

The top 3 will qualify for the 2014 Copa do Brasil. The two best teams that aren't on Campeonato Brasileiro Série A, Série B or Série C qualify to the Série D.

Participating teams

First stage

Results

Final stage

References

2013
Goiano